Fraternal may refer to:

Fraternal organization, an organized society of men associated together in an environment of companionship and brotherhood, dedicated to the intellectual, physical, and social development of its members
 Fraternal order, a fraternity organised as an order
 Fraternal correction, the admonishing of one's neighbor by a private individual with the purpose of reforming or, if possible, preventing the neighbor's sinful indulgence
 Fraternal party, a political party officially affiliated with another, often larger and/or international, political party or governmental party
 Fraternal Day, a legal holiday in the state of Alabama in the United States

See also

 Fraternity (disambiguation)